Hobbs Quarry is a 0.5 hectare geological Site of Special Scientific Interest near Shepton Mallet on the Mendip Hills in Somerset, notified in 1984.

This disused quarry, which now forms the back of a builders merchants yard, is a Geological Conservation Review Site which demonstrates early Jurassic transgression, with steeply-dipping Carboniferous Limestone being overlain by flatter-lying massive limestones (of early Jurassic age) known as the Downside Stone.

See also
 Quarries of the Mendip Hills

Sources
 English Nature citation sheet for the site (accessed 22 July 2006)

External links
 Natural England website (SSSI information)

Sites of Special Scientific Interest in Somerset
Sites of Special Scientific Interest notified in 1984
Quarries in the Mendip Hills
Geology of Somerset
Shepton Mallet